Peeter Vähi (born 18 May 1955, Tartu) is a classical Estonian composer. Vähi's work Relaxatio, written in 1992 and inspired by Asian intonal elements of Tibetan canticles, is a noted electronic work of psychotherapeutic music.

Discography 
 Music for Synthesizers (1989) Melodiya (vinyl LP), Works: "Reverence", "Evening Music", "Concerto grosso", "Gates", performed by: Mati Kärmas, Ivo Sillamaa, Andrus Vaht, Peeter Vähi, C60 28297 004
 The Path to the Heart of Asia (1992) Erdenklang (CD), (based on oriental folk music), 20602
 2000 Years After the Birth of Christ (1995) Forte (CD), performed by: Kaia Urb, Works: "Hortus Musicus", "The Bad Orchestra", FD 0016/2
 2000 Years After the Birth of Christ (1995) Antes Edition Classics (CD), performed by: Kaia Urb, Works: "Hortus Musicus", "The Bad Orchestra", BM-CD 31.9059
Sounds of the Silver Moon (1996) Forte (CD), Co-authorship: Abhay Phagre, Krishna Kumar Kapoor, FD 0038/2
 To His Highness Salvador D (1997) Antes Edition Classics (CD), Works: "To His Highness Salvador D", "Mystical Uniting", "Digital Love", "Concerto Piccolo", "Four Engravings of Reval", Performed by: Hortus Musicus, Camerata Tallinn, 1997 Antes Edition Classics BM CD 31.9086
 Supreme Silence (1998) CCn’C (CD), Work: "Supreme Silence", performed by: Irén Lovász, Estonian National Male Choir RAM, English Handbell Ensemble Arsis, Konchok Lundrup and Kristjan Järvi
 Handbell Symphony (1997) Antes Edition Classics (CD), Work: "Handbell Symphony", Performed by: English Handbell Ensemble Arsis and Estonian National Symphony Orchestra, 
 A Chant of Bamboo (2006) (vinyl LP), Works: "A Chant Of Bamboo", "The White Concerto", "Forty-two", "Mystical Uniting", performed by: Tallinn Chamber Orchestra, Slava Grigoryan, Neeme Punder, Nils Rõõmussaar, Andres Uibo, Risto Joost. Live in Estonia Concert Hall, March 16, 2006, ERP 1006 
 Chrysanthemum Garden (2007) CCn’C Records (Germany) (non-physical release), Works: "Chrysanthemum Garden Chant", "Green Tār"ā, performed by: Tokyo Philharmonic Chorus, Matsubara Chifuru (Japan), Fujisaki Shigeyasu (shinobue-flute, Japan), Girl's Choir Ellerhein, Tiia-Ester Loitme, Sevara Nazarkhan (vocal, Uzbekistan), musicians of Estonian National Opera, 
 Maria Magdalena (2012) Estonian Records Productions (Super Audio CD), Work: "Mary Magdalene Gospel", performed by: Peeter Volkonski, Sevara Nazarkhan, Priit Volmer, Mixed Choir Latvija, Riga Dom Cathedral Boys Choir, Latvian National Symphony Orchestra, Risto Joost, ERP 5412
 In the Mystical Land of Kaydara (2017) Estonian Records Productions (DVD), Work: "In the Mystical Land of Kaydara", an African initiation rite, performed by: Tanel Padar, Mati Turi, Rauno Elp, Priit Volmer, Girls' Choir Ellerhein, Estonian National Male Choir, Estonian National Symphony Orchestra, Mihhail Gerts, video director Jüri Tallinn, 2017 / SSI ERP 8816
 Hommage a Brilliance De Lune (2020) Estonian Record Productions Works: "Hommage a Brilliance De Lune (single CD), Beethoven-Vähi, performed by: Hortus Musicus, ERP 11920
 Tamula Fire Collage (double CD), Works: "Saatus / Fate", "The Flutish Kingdom, Being and Nothingness in Kostabi's Atelier", "2000 Years After The Birth Of Christ", performed and/or co-composed by: Neeme Punder, Siiri Sisask, Kirile Loo, "Hortus Musicus"

References

External links 
 www.peetervahi.com
 Peeter Vähi: Oeuvres (in French)

1955 births
20th-century classical composers
20th-century Estonian composers
20th-century male musicians
21st-century Estonian composers
21st-century male musicians
Living people
Male classical composers
People from Tartu
Recipients of the Order of the White Star, 5th Class